Ethel Kirkpatrick (1869–1966) was a British painter, printmaker and jeweller. She was a marine and landscape painter, mainly working in oil and watercolour but also producing woodcuts.

Early life and training 
Ethel Alice Kirkpatrick, was the second daughter of Mary Ann Rosa Kirkpatrick (nee Marriott) and Thomas Sutton Kirkpatrick. Her older sister was Ida Marion Kirkpatrick who introduced her to art. Their father, after leaving a position in the Indian Army, worked in the prison service, later as governor of Exeter, Newgate and then Wormwood Scrubs prisons. Kirkpatrick studied at the Royal Academy School and at the Central School of Arts and Crafts .

Working life 
Both Ethel and her older sister Ida travelled to artist’s colonies in St Ives, Cornwall and Walberswick, Suffolk. Thus they both appear in biographical lists of Suffolk artists and Cornwall artists. After their father died, a large studio was built for the sisters behind the house in London in which they were living.

Ethel Kirkpatrick produced paintings and woodcut work in colour.  From 1891 she began exhibiting at several London galleries, at the Royal Academy of Arts Summer Exhibitions twelve times 1895-1941 and with the Royal Society of British Artists. Kirkpatrick was a member of the Society of Graver Painters and of the Colour Woodcut Society. Colour woodcuts by her are in the collections of the National Gallery of Canada and the Victoria and Albert Museum. Both the Hunterian Museum and the British Museum hold examples of her prints. Examples of her and her sister Ida's work were included in ‘Print and Prejudice: Women Printmakers, 1700-1930’, an exhibition at the Victoria and Albert Museum in London, 2022-23.

References

1869 births
1966 deaths
19th-century British women artists
20th-century British women artists
Alumni of the Central School of Art and Design
Alumni of the Royal Academy Schools
Sibling artists